37 ohne Zwiebeln is a German short film directed by André Erkau. The film premiered at the 2006 Max Ophüls Preis film festival and is also the director's final thesis at the Cologne Academy of Media Arts.

Plot
Lukas Knispe's childhood dream was to become a diver, he loved the slowness and stillness underwater. Now, at 37, he is the sales manager of a sizeable business, and his work is anything but slow and still. So far this has not been a problem for Lukas Knispe, as opposed to the jumps, gaps and lapses in time which have been troubling him for some time now. For example, Lukas Knispe skids from the canteen into the conference room without knowing how he turned up there. Or he learns nothing from a discussion in the conference room because moments later he finds himself back in the office. Knispe's efforts to get a grip on his life, to get back in touch with himself and his time, end in chaos. Lukas Knispe only manages it once he becomes emotionally stable. But this, too, proves to be no easy task.

Cast
 Bernd Moss as Lukas Knispe
 Linda Olsansky as Maria
 Bjarne Mädel as Ben

Awards 
2006: Best Short Film, Filmfestival Max Ophüls Preis
2006: Special Mention, Internationales Kurzfilm-Festival Hamburg
2006: Best Script, Studio Hamburg Nachwuchspreis

References

External links
 

2006 films
German comedy short films
2000s German-language films
2000s German films